Kalantar (also Romanized as Kalāntar) is a village in Abish Ahmad Rural District, Abish Ahmad District, Kaleybar County, East Azerbaijan Province, Iran. At the 2006 census, its population was 800, in 176 families.

References 

Populated places in Kaleybar County